Francis & Barnett Limited was an English motorcycle manufacturer founded in 1919 by Gordon Inglesby Francis and Arthur Barnett and based in Lower Ford Street, Coventry, England. Early motor cycles were affectionately known as ' Franny B'. Motorcycles were produced for enthusiasts and was reasonably affordable for citizens for use as general transport. The majority of the lighter motorcycles used Villiers and later Two-stroke engine and later Associated Motor Cycles AMC engines. During the 1930s the 250cc Cruiser model  was developed with a faired engine that protected those riding from any oil or dirt – one of the first of its kind to do so. AMC took over Francis & Barnett Limited in 1947 combining this with the James motorcycle models in 1957. The combined company remained in business until 1966.

The Lea Francis cycle and motorcycle business had been formed by Graham Francis and R.H. Lea in 1895, who was the son of Graham Francis who manufactured motorcycles under the name 'Lea Francis', went into partnership with Arthur Barnett to create Francis & Barnett Limited. Gordon married a lady whose father was Arthur Barnett and already producing Invicta motorcycles. Both Francis and Barnett both related by marriage started in the same company's workshop as that of Bayliss Thomas and Company Limited in Lower Ford Street, Coventry, established in 1874, who produced the Excelsior model. They were reformed as the Excelsior Motor Cycle Company in 1909. Photograph of Excelsior No1 Works, Bayliss Thomas and Company taken outside the works before 1909 - this is the same works that Francis-Barnett move into. The first English motorcycle produced which continued until 1965. At first Francis Barnett machines were little more than re-badged Invicta motor cycles. During the 1920s Francis Barnett made supple sheet metal work and pressings for the motor industry that proved successful. In 1947 Francis Barnett took over Clarendon Pressings and Welding Company Limited. In 1948 Output was increased and Industrial trolleys and pressed fabricated parts for the motor industry were made. Photographs and story of Clarendon Pressings and Welding Company, in Clarendon Street, Earlsdon, Coventry.

The very first new Francis-Barnett motorcycle was well pronounced by its bright red and black fuel tank and J.A.P. 292cc side valve engine with two speed Sturmey Archer gearbox , but production costs were an early problem. Gordon Francis learned from his army days having seen damaged motorcycles in his Motor Transport Workshop and considered a design of bolted straight tubes as a simple replacement frame. He overcame cost factors by first looking at the problem of frequent fractures of the motorcycles frames and evolved a six straight tubular frame with one of the pairs specially formed. The hub of the rear wheel up to the saddle and footrest formed a triangle and the frame below the tank an inverted triangle. The tank itself was held in position by similarly formed tubes. The frame could be bolted together with basic tools. In 1923 he exhibited a machine with this type of frame at Olympia. Riders like Tom Meeten took part at Brooklands and Scottish 6-Day Trials and stunts such as riding up Snowdon. On 12 July 1928 a trio of riders started at the foot of Snowdon at Llanberis Station. John Moxon and Geoffrey Jones from Villiers and Eric Barnett from Francis Barnett. They covered the 3,270 feet of ascent in 22 minutes. The Supersport 172cc 2.75HP was awarded Gold and silver medals at the Scottish six day Trials in 1924.

Continuing with cost factors and simplicity in mind the new wheels of the new Francis Barnet were on spindles and easily removed. The 147cc Villiers two-stroke engine with flywheel magneto was light with a two speed Albion gearbox, a three speed was an option, and very easily reassembled and at a very low cost. The construction came with a no breakage forever guarantee. Other 250cc and 350cc machines were also produced with a sidecars as an option. The Pullman model followed in 1928 with a 344cc vertical in-line two-stroke Villiers engine. From 1928 to 1930 the black motorcycles followed the fashion and were coloured cream. They reverted to black in 1931 and to Arden Green around 1947. 

In 1937 Arthur Barnett died aged 74 and his son, Eric took over his father's position at the company as sales director. Eric Barnett was killed by a lorry that failed to stop in 1963. From 1938 a new 98cc Powerbike was made alongside the 125cc Snipe and these were intended for the military soon after the outbreak of World War Two. During the air raids over Coventry in 1940 the Frances Barnett Factory was completely destroyed. The company continued making parts during the war at an alternative location. It was not until 1945 that production resumed back at Lower Ford Street with the 98cc Powerbike and then the 125cc Merlin. The Plover, Falcon and Kestrel machines followed.

Francis Barnett was amalgamated with Associated Motor Cycles in 1947. About that time Francis Barnett brought back the Cruiser names with a 171cc AMC engined Light Cruiser. The motorcycles Plover, Falcon and Cruiser were successful right into the 1950s as good light machines in Arden Green rather than the black finish of earlier days. James vehicles were in maroon. AMC considered Wolverhampton based Villiers to be dictatorial and they commissioned Italian designer Vincenzo Piatti to design a new engine to replace the Villier' engine. The Villiers engine was discontinued in new models in favour of AMC's Piatti designed unit. Unfortunately this did not work well due to cost and unreliability of the AMC manufactured engine. AMC reverted Francis Barnett bikes back to a Villiers engine again. The Falcon 87 with a 199cc single cylinder two stroke AMC engine was introduced and remained in production until 1966. Also that year the Cruiser 84 with a fully enclosed rear wheel and leg shields as standard equipment was available. The first Cruiser was made in 1932 and is a quiet machine made for riders where special wet proof clothing was not required. The engine being enclosed with good leg-shield and mudguard protection. The Cruiser is displayed at Lord Montague's National Motor Museum, Beaulieu.

In an attempt to break away from Villiers’ monopoly supply of engines, AMC commissioned Italian designer Vincenzo Piatti to design all-new two-stroke engines. Piatti was already known to AMC management through his novel, but breathtakingly ugly, Piatti scooters, but the project was a total mess from start to finish. First of all, Piatti's design – constrained by AMC's demands for cost cutting rather than quality – was very conservative. Second, it was poorly made by AMC and soon gained a strong reputation for unreliability. Added to this was an all-enveloping dullness which reflected a tired management, distant from its customer base.

In the early 1960s changes in the marketplace caused a transfer of production to Greet in Birmingham in 1962 to join James motorcycles. The Lower Ford Rd, Coventry Factory was closed down and some staff moved to James. The James and Francis Barnett bikes became virtually the same apart from cosmetic changes of colours and badges. The last new model was produced in 1962, the newly designed Fulmar with a spine frame, pressed steel bodywork, leading link forks and 149cc AMC engine. Production of Francis Barnett motorcycles continued until 4 August 1966 when the AMC Empire was taken over by Manganese Bronze. Both Francis Barnett and James ceased to exist from October of that year.

In the popular British television series Heartbeat a Francis Barnett Falcon F150 is featured as the police motorcycle, before being replaced by a BSA Golden Flash.

Francis-Barnett Powerbike and Motorcycle Models 1919–1966
List of models:

 1919/1925 – Francis Barnet badged Invicta  269cc 4-stroke Villiers engine, 346cc 4-stroke engine, 678cc sv J.A.P chain driven 4-stroke engine and 499cc Abingdon 4-stroke engine, Abingdon Motorcycles: A Francis Barnett badged Invicta took part in the Isle of Man TT in 1922 but failed to finish. By 1923 Francis Barnett had continued just with 247cc, 292cc and 346cc 4-stroke engines.
 1921/1925 – 292cc J.A.P. side valve 4-stroke engine, Coventry chain and Dunlop belt drive and neat chain cover, comes with two speed Sturmey Archer gearbox. Noted for its Red and black distinctive petrol tank it also came with Quick adjusting rear brake, foot boards, toe guards and sprung forks:
 1921/1925 – 346cc J.A.P 4-stroke engine with 3-speed Sturmey Archer gearbox, change lever mounted with gearbox. 
 1921/1925 – Model 250 247cc J.A.P. 4-stroke engine: Model 350 346cc J.A.P. all chain drive 4-stroke engine: Code named "Zarteetee" the bike raced in the 1923 Isle of Man TT finishing 21st out of 41 riders taking part. From 1923 both 250cc and 350cc machines were sold with sidecars.
 1923/1930 – Models 1, 2, 3, 4, 4B,  147cc ( 1 1/2HP ) Villiers engine with Albion twin speed gearbox: Model 1 was push start and belt drive, known as  the "zarabout", with optional extras of clutch and kickstarter, model 2, was belt drive with kickstarter, models 3, and 4, were chain drive. Models 1,2 and 3 had no front brake and the handlebar lever was a secondary control for the rear brake – second brake required by law. Model 4, 4B, had a Villiers 2T engine and 3-speed optional extra gearbox, front and rear expanding hub brakes and leg shields. All were coloured throughout with black enamel.
 1925/1929 – AZA, 147cc J.A.P. 2-stroke engines with 3-speed gearbox, clutch and kickstarter: produced by JA Prestwich Industries & Co, Northumberland Park, Tottenham:
 1925/1929 – AZA, 175cc J.A.P. 2-stroke engines with 3-speed gearbox, clutch and kickstarter. Finished in black enamel.
 1923/1930 – Model 5, 7 and 9,  1 3/4HP 172cc Villiers engine, 3 speed clutch and quiet start,  belt chain drive and model 9 256cc Empire models; rare models are fitted with 196cc engines: Model 9 172cc was coloured black with maroon tank and the TT model all black. During 1928 and 1929 the UK War Office tested the Empire model 9 two-strokes fitted with Pullman 344cc frames . Due to durability problems with the two-stroke engine they went with other manufacturers.
 1922/1928 – Sports 147cc Villiers 1 3/4HP chain drive model and 3 speed Albion gearbox, colour black enamel: Supersport 172cc Villiers 2 3/4HP with Albion 3-speed gearbox – Awarded Gold and silver medals at the Scottish six day Trials 
 1924–1927 – A 172cc, 3.5HP, OHV Blackburne 4-stroke engine specially built for Tommy Meeten, achieved sixth place in the 1924 Isle of Man TT for Ultra-Lightweight motorcycles and raced in the sidecar event. It had a featherweight aluminium sidecar fitted which still survives in the Coventry collection.
 1928–1930  Model 10, Pullman vertical twin in-line 344cc two-stroke Villiers engine and 3 speed gearbox – Limited production. These machines were coloured cream from 1928 to 1930 to follow fashion at the time. Some very early examples were in black enamel. They were discontinued due to cooling problems.:
 1927 – 172cc Brooklands Track Special, coloured Dark Green: Raced and built by T.G. (Tommy) Meeten. It had a Long range fuel tank and achieved endurance records during 1927, over 6 hours at 50 mph.
 1929/1931 – Empire model 12, fitted with Villiers 147cc, 172cc and 247cc two-stroke engine with 3-speed Albion gearbox. There were two 147cc, two 172cc and one 247cc, the latter introduced in 1930 after further development. Colour black with black and white tank.
 1930/1931 – Dominion Model 16 350  342cc J.A.P. 4-stroke engine:
 1930/1931 – Supersport Models 14, 15, 17, 18,   Villiers 196cc MK 2E supersport 2-stroke engine:
 1931/1936 – Blackhawk models 21, 29, 30, 36, 37,  196cc Villiers engine: colour Black enamel with black and white tank.
 1931/1934 – Falcon models 22, 31, 38,  196cc Villiers engine:
 1932/1933 – Merlin model 23,  147cc Villiers engine: colour black enamel.
 1932/1934 – Kestrel model 24, 147cc Villiers engine:
 1932/1933 – Condor Sports model 26,  Villiers 172cc Brooklands engine: colour black enamel with silver and black tank. Rare model with only one or two thought to exist.
 1933/1934 – Falcon TT  175cc Villiers: colour black with silver tank.
 1930/1935 – Lapwing models 25, 27, 28, 32, 33, 34, 35,  148cc and 196cc Villiers engine: A model 32T 148cc engine racer was made in small quantities – one was ridden by Tommy Meeton in the Six-Day-Trial in 1933 and won a silver medal – it was fully in black enamel. Generally in black with a black and silver tank.
 1933/1940 – Cruiser models E32, 39, E39, F39, K39, J39, F45, G37, G45,  248cc  MKIVA 14A Villiers engine, model 45 MK17A and 18A from 1939, 4-speed Albion Hand-change Gearbox, colour black with brown saddle:  – Cruiser models 45 with foot change from 1938:
 1935/1941 – Plover models 40, F40, H40, K40, J40, 41, F41, J41, K41, G40, G41,  148cc Villiers Long-Stroke with 3-speed gearbox, coloured black: The war office experimented with a number of 148cc Plovers but went to James and Enfield probably due to the bombing of Francis Barnett's factory. Some Plover models are in wartime drab olive or dull brown.
 1935/1940 – Seagull models 42, 43, F43, G43, H43, J43, K43, G47, H47, J47, K47,   248cc Villiers two-stroke with 3-speed Albion gearbox, colour black or black with silver tank: J47, was fitted with a 4-speed Albion gearbox.
 1935/1940 – Stag and Red Stag models F44, F46, G46,  Blackburne 248cc 4 stroke OHV engine Blackburne (motorcycles): The Red Stag was fitted with Dunlop tyres, narrow guards and a special finish – black with a silver and red tank and wheel rims. The Red Stag G46 is a rare machine produced 1936 – 1938.
 1939/1949 – Powerbike J50G pre-war, K50H post-war, Auto-cycle 98cc Junior Villiers engine, early models were unsprung, Junior Villiers Deluxe engine introduced in 1940 with sprung forks, ( a letter H after the frame number means that Harwii hubs instead of British are fitted), colour black with silver or maroon tank or all black, Deluxe in all green – Production stopped in 1940, resumed in 1945:
 1949/1952 – Powerbike 56N, Auto-cycle 98cc MK 2F Villiers engine: Introduced in June 1949. Withdrawn in 1952 as cycle motor attachments became popular.
 1938/1940 – Snipe model K40, K41, K48, J49,  Villiers 98cc and model K49, Villiers J48 122cc engine with 3-speed gearbox and colour in black enamel – The Snipe was adapted for war use and some were produced in wartime drab olive. Production stopped in 1940 after the factory was destroyed in the 1940 Blitz and not resumed. It was replaced by Merlin:
 1946/1949 – Merlin model 51, L51  122cc 9D Villiers engine:   
 1947 –  Light Cruiser  171cc AMC engine, red with white tank and mudguards:
 1949/1953 – Falcon model 54, 55, 58, 60  Villiers 197cc 6E engine with rigid and spring frame: Noted for 20" long front fork springs, long silencer and foot brake. Colour black enamel or optional azure blue. Some models are found modified for Trials.
 1950s – Starmaker 249cc competition model: Early 1950s Model 85  197cc 6E and 7E Villiers engines, later 249cc AMC engine, Trials bike:
 1946/1953 –  Merlin models 52, 53, 57, 59, 61, 63,  122cc 10D Villiers engine with 3-speed gearbox with rigid and spring frame, colour black: In 2004 the Merlin was honourably mentioned at The Butlers Orchard Motorcycle Show in Maryland, USA. Taking First Place  at the Westminster Maryland Antique Motor Cycle Show.
 1953/1955 – Falcon model 62T, 64T,  197cc 7E/8E Villiers engine, colour black: A quite rare machine. Ridden by Arther Shutt to victory in the annual Scott Trial, Yorkshire 1953 and by George Fisher in 1955 finishing second.
 1954/1955 – Falcon model 65, 67,  197cc 8E Villiers engine with 4-speed gearbox: Came with knee grips on petrol tank and lifting handles. Colour black with chrome and gold lined petrol tank finish and available in azure blue as an optional extra.
 1954/1956 –  Manufacturers Award Team Bikes ISDT 175cc and 197cc – Ridden by Ernie Smith, George Fisher and Dick Kemp. The route of the International Six Days Trial ISDT, Garmisch-Partenkirchen, West Germany 1956. The 1955 event was in Gottwaldov, Czechoslovakia. Renamed International Six Days Enduro ISDE in 1981.
 1954/1957 – Cruiser models 68, 71, 75, 80,  Villiers 224cc MK1H  engine and 4-speed gearbox with indicator and 12ch battery: came in Arden green and chrome finish or Azure blue with Arden green saddle.
 1954/1955 – Kestrel model 66,  13D, 32D  Villiers 122cc 13D engine: Bike was produced in Azure blue, chromium and gold.
 1955/1956 – Kestrel model 69, 147cc 30C Villiers engine: Produced for one year in black enamel.
 1956/1959 – Plover models 73, 78,  Villiers 147cc 30C and 3-speed gearbox in Arden Green: The 1957 F-B 78 came with full weather equipment "Home and Dry" usually in red with a black seat.
 1954/1957 – Falcon models 70, 70C, 72, 74, 76, 77,  197cc 7E/8E Villiers engines, colour black or later in arden green. 1958 – 1960 Falcon model 81, 197cc 10E. Falcon 70 was displayed at Earls Court stand 103 in 1954, noted for battery stored in toolbox. Falcon models 70, 74, 76, 81, can be found with re-working of the lower frame for Trials.
 1956/1957 – Falcon model 76T Trials bike  197cc 7e Villiers engine with 4-speed Albion gearbox, colour silver: This is a rare bike as few survive.
 1957/1963 – Cruiser model 80,  249cc 25T AMC engine, colour arden green or red and white:
 1958/1961 – Light Cruiser model 79,  174cc 17T AMC engine with 4-speed gearbox: Available in Arden Green, all black, Arden Green with white mudguards or white with black frame.
 1958/1959 – Falcon Scrambler model 82,  249cc 25T AMC engine or 246cc 32A Villiers engine: Colour silver with black seat - ridden by scramblers John Compton, Bryan and Triss Sharp.
 1958/1962 – Falcon models 83, 85, 87, 92,  AMC 197cc 10E engine and 4-speed gearbox: Colour Arden Green with Arden Green tank with silver striped motif or Black and white. These can be found with a lightweight alloy frame replacing the heavier steel frame, made by Whitton, Wright, Holland and Angus principally for Trials. A Falcon 87 in black and white was used in the BBC television series Heartbeat.
 1959/1962 – Falcon Trials model 83T, 85T,  249cc 25T Villiers engine: 1960 – 1965 Falcon model 87 199cc 20T AMC engine: Colour Black, with white tank and silver mud guards.
 1959/1962 – Cruiser model 84,  249cc 25T AMC engine- Red and white with black seat.
 1960/1962 – Plover model 86,  149cc 15T AMC engine: Colour Arden green, green and white tank..
 1962/1965 – Cruiser model 89,  249cc 2T and 4T twin cylinder Villiers engines: The 2T engine is reported smoother with more Torque and the 4T engine has better performance and cooling provision. Comes in Arden Green with gold line trims or Arden Green and cream
 1962/1966 – Fulmar Sports 88, 88T, 90, 90T,  149cc 15T AMC engine and 4-speed gearbox: Noted for low centre of gravity due to engine mounted position and reserve tank. The Fulmar 90T is a rare motorcycle used in 6-Day Trials – thought to be just 3 left in the world. Fulmar 88T Trials bike comes with a red frame, silver mudguards, tank and supports. Fulmar 88 is black with white tank. Alternative Silver with red tank and seat, or red frame and mudguards – some having white rear and a front red mudguard or/and alternative white cowling. Fulmar 90 is red and silver or late models, white with red tank cover.
 1963/1966 – Cruiser Sports Twin model 91,  Villiers 249cc 2T and 4T engine: Colour Red frame, Silver mudguards and trim with a Red or red and silver tank – late models all red with black seat.
 1963/1965 – Falcon Trials model 92T,  Villiers 246cc 32A engine. Colour red with silver tank and mudguards..
 1963/1965 – Fulmar Scrambler model 93, Villiers 246cc 32A engine:
 1964/1965 – Fulmar Scrambler model 94, Starmaker 247cc:
 1964/1966 – Plover models 95, 96,  149cc 15T AMC engine: Model 95, is in Arden green with a black and white tank. Model 96, is in all Metallic green or with black mudguards.
 1966/1967 – Plover TT Supersport  172cc engine: Sold until 1967

Francis & Barnett Ltd. of Coventry also made bayonets. The finish quality was not the same standard as the government factories. These bayonets were very rare, with only a handful of known examples.

Francis-Barnett Powered Cycle and Motorcycle 2015 – 

A new company, Francis Barnett Coventry, formed in 2015, produces Francis Barnett powered cycles and motorcycles a few miles outside Coventry in the town of Kenilworth. Models produced are the Batribike, Francis, Falcon 4-stroke, Merlin, Kestrel, E-Dirt Bike and Oset models.

References

External links
Francis-Barnett Owners Club
http://www.gracesguide.co.uk/wiki/Francis-Barnett

Defunct motorcycle manufacturers of the United Kingdom
Coventry motor companies
Defunct motor vehicle manufacturers of England
1919 establishments in England
British companies established in 1919
Vehicle manufacturing companies established in 1919
1966 disestablishments in England